Eduardo Pedro Hungaro, known as Eduardo Hungaro (born August 16, 1976 in Rio de Janeiro), is a Brazilian football (soccer) manager.

Career
Hungaro began his career as a coach of youth teams in various clubs. He began to be visible in the 2007/2008 season, when he led Sertanense in the quarter-final of the Taça de Portugal. At the time the club was in the Terceira Divisão of the country (equivalent to Serie D in Brazil).

In 2010, he was promoted to command the Botafogo U13. The following year, he was promoted to the U20, leading them to a state championship title. He served as assistant Oswaldo de Oliveira.

After the departure of Oswaldo, who accepted an offer from Santos. he was named manager of Botafogo. He was fired after a poor campaign and elimination in the group stage of the Libertadores 2014. He still worked in Botafogo, as assistant coach.

Honours

Club honours
 Sertanense
 Terceira Divisão – Série D: 2008–09

 Botafogo
 2011 Campeonato Carioca Sub-20
 2013 Torneio Otávio Pinto Guimarães

External links

1963 births
Sportspeople from Rio de Janeiro (city)
Brazilian football managers
Botafogo de Futebol e Regatas managers
Associação Desportiva Cabofriense managers
Ríver Atlético Clube managers
Living people